Jason Fisk (born September 4, 1972) is a retired NFL defensive tackle. He played high school football at Davis High School, and college football at Stanford University, where he lettered four years. He was a member of the Delta Tau Delta fraternity and earned degrees in biology and psychology while at Stanford.

Fisk was selected by the Minnesota Vikings with the 35th pick in the seventh round (243rd out of 249 overall) of the 1995 NFL Draft. He played for the Vikings (1995–1998), Tennessee Titans (1999–2001), San Diego Chargers (2002–2004), Cleveland Browns (2005) and St. Louis Rams (2006). While with the Titans, he played in Super Bowl XXXIV, where he recorded a sack of MVP Kurt Warner.

Fisk retired following the 2006 season. He previously coached for his high school football team, the Davis High School Blue Devils, and then coached at UC Davis. He is currently a science teacher at Chartwell High School in Seaside, California.

Fisk is married with three children.

External links
DraftHistory.com 1995
NFLPLAYERS.com bio
NFL.com bio
NFL.com St. Louis Rams Team News

American football defensive tackles
Cleveland Browns players
Minnesota Vikings players
San Diego Chargers players
Sportspeople from Greater Sacramento
St. Louis Rams players
Stanford Cardinal football players
Tennessee Titans players
People from Davis, California
1972 births
Living people
Davis Senior High School (California) alumni
Players of American football from California